This is a list of rivers of North Macedonia.

By drainage basin
This list is arranged by drainage basin, with respective tributaries indented under each larger stream's name.

Aegean Sea 
 Vardar
 Treska
 Golema Reka
 Lepenac
 Nerodimka
 Kadina River
 Pčinja
 Kriva Reka
 Kumanovska Reka
 Topolka
 Babuna
 Crnička Reka
 Bregalnica
 Zrnovska Reka
 Lakavica
 Otinja
 Crna Reka
 Šemnica
 Dragor
 Raec
 Bošava
 Dosznica
 Stragarnica
 Anska Reka
 Konska Reka
 Pena
 Struma (in Bulgaria) 
 Lebnica
 Strumica
 Stara Reka

Adriatic Sea 
 Drim (in Albania) 
 Black Drin
 Sateska
 Golema Reka
 Radika
 Derven
 Ribnička
 Dlaboka

Black Sea 
 Danube (in Serbia) 
 Južna Morava (in Serbia) 
 Binačka Morava

Drainage basins in North Macedonia 

 
North Macedonia
Rivers